The Instituto Federal de Educação, Ciência e Tecnologia do Paraná (IFPR) (Paraná Federal Institute of Education, Science and Technology), also known as the late Escola Técnica da Universidade Federal do Paraná (ET-UFPR), is an institution that offers high and professional educations by having a pluricurricular form. It is an multicampi institution, specialized in offering professional and technological education in different areas of knowledge (biology, humanities, and STEM disciplines).

The IFPR is a public federal institution, directly bound to the Ministry of Education of Brazil.

Campuses 

Curitiba 
Assis Chateaubriand
Cascavel
Campo Largo 
Foz do Iguaçu
Irati 
Ivaiporã
Jacarezinho
Londrina
Palmas
Paranaguá 
Paranavaí
Telêmaco Borba  
Umuarama

See also
Federal University of Paraná
Federal University of Technology - Paraná

References

Educational institutions established in 2008
Federal Institutes of Education, Science and Technology in Brazil
Universities and colleges in Curitiba
Cascavel
Foz do Iguaçu
Education in Londrina
Paranaguá
Umuarama
Paranavaí
Education in Telêmaco Borba
2008 establishments in Brazil
Jacarezinho, Paraná
Ivaiporã